The 1977–78 South-West Indian Ocean cyclone season was an above average cyclone season. The season officially ran from November 1, 1977, to April 30, 1978.

Systems

Intense Tropical Cyclone Aurore

Moderate Tropical Storm Babette

Moderate Tropical Storm Sam–Celimene

Tropical Depression Dulcinee

Moderate Tropical Storm Esther

Tropical Cyclone Fleur

Heavy rainfall occurred on neighboring Réunion, reaching  at Foc Foc.

Moderate Tropical Storm Huberte

The storm passed near Rodrigues.

Moderate Tropical Storm Georgia

Severe Tropical Storm Irena

Moderate Tropical Storm Jacqueline

Moderate Tropical Storm Kiki

On March 7, Kiki reformed near Mauritius and latter passed just southeast of Réunion. Rainfall reached , which flooded coastal roads, damaged bridges, and killed two people.

Tropical Depression Lucie

Moderate Tropical Storm Marylou

Severe Tropical Storm Nadine

See also
Atlantic hurricane seasons: 1977, 1978
Eastern Pacific hurricane seasons: 1977, 1978
Western Pacific typhoon seasons: 1977, 1978
North Indian Ocean cyclone seasons: 1977, 1978

References

South-West Indian Ocean cyclone seasons
1977–78 Southern Hemisphere tropical cyclone season